Mirza Adigozal bey (1780s – September 9, 1848) was an Azerbaijani historian of the 19th century, author of the Garabaghname. He studied at maktab, in Shusha. From the beginning of the 19th century, he was in the governmental and military-administrative service of Russia. He was captain of the Imperial Russian Army.

Initial period of the service
In 1795, with the approach of Mohammad Khan Qajar’s troops to Karabakh, Mirza Adigozel bey left Karabakh and resettled to Kartli-Kakheti (eastern Georgia) with his family and ilats (nomads) who depended on them and lived apparently in Iyirmidordskiy (Twenty fourth) mahal located near the Aras river.

After the annexation of Kartli-Kakheti by Russia in 1801, minister Kovalenskiy accepted Mirza Adigozal bey, to service for conducting secret affairs by correspondence in Tiflis. Adigozel bey served at Kovalenskiy secretly. He got a salary for the service. Obviously, he held the position during late 1799 and all 1800. From that time Mirza Adigozal bey linked his destiny to the Russian administration and Russian troops in the South Caucasus for a long time.

During the Russo-Turkish War of 1806–1812, he held the position of translator-clerk at major-general D. Lisanevich. He wrote in his autobiography:

In 1816, Mirza Adigozal bey was sent to Mehdigulu khan by A.P.Yermolov as a resident of Karabakh. It happened in 1816, before A.P.Yermolov’s departure to Tehran as an ambassador. Mehdigulu Khan of Karabakh granted bey lands, which belonged to their family, and also a lot of populated areas and appointed him a naib of Iyirmidordskiy mahal. He was in service of protection of boundaries of Karabakh for three years, from 1823 to 1826, by order of general Yermolov. Knyaz Madatov showed the post of Mirza Adigozal bey in a schedule of border posts. The document says:

Participation in the Russo-Persian War of 1826–1828
The Russo-Persian War (1826–1828) began after the Russians occupied parts of Iran's Erivan Khanate, in violation of the Treaty of Gulistan, and the Iranians reacted by sending in troops. Iranian troops moved into Shuragel and Pambak and also into Talysh and Karabakh. Frontier posts, which hadn’t got enough strength made a fighting retreat far inland. Mirza Adigozal bey and his entrusted detachments’ cutting off from communication with Shusha and Tiflis, was a result of earlier invasion of Iranian troops into the post near Bazirgan spring which was located near the very border.

The circumstances became complicated when certain groups of local population, depending on that stratum which was closely related to khan’s power during the reign of khans, became turncoat and allured some part of nomads during the invasion of troops of the enemy.  After the liquidation of khan administration, these insignificant number of strata of yuzbashis, maafs, ketkhudas, and some part of beys, losing their former preferred positions and sources of material welfare, attempted to return the old rules. They expected that Iranian troops will re-establish the former structure of government and return them their lost welfare. They knew that Mehdigulu khan of Karabakh was among the troops of Abbas Mirza-legatee of Iranian throne.

After that, Mirze Adigozel bey decided to appear on the bid of the Prince Royal. Mirze Adigozal bey was sent to Tabriz as a captive.

After the defeat of the Iranian troops under Shamkir and in the general battle in Ganja, Abbas Mirza began to prepare for peace talks. For this purpose, at the beginning of 1827, the prince set Mirza Adigozal bey free and sent him back to Shusha. In that very year, Mirza Adigozal bey crossed into the home front of the enemy under the command of Prince Ivan Abkhazov, and beyond the river Aras met Mehdigulu khan and inclined him to across to the Russia. Highly appreciating his services in execution of the order related to drawing Mehdigulu khan to Russian side, general Paskevich
conferred Mirza Adigozal bey with prize. He wrote about that in one of his reports:

It seems that Mirza Adigozal bey didn’t actively participate in the further course of the war.

Retirement from military service
In late 1829 and early 1830, Mirza Adigozal bey retired after serving for 30 years.

In the 1830s, Mirza Adigozal bey worked at provincial court of Karabakh, which gave him an opportunity to become familiar with historically well-established conditions and character of population’s economic activity in different parts of the province  and with traditions of this place.

Deep respect to eminent personalities of the past initiated Mirza Adigozal bey to construct a new mausoleum on great Nizami’s grave, instead of the old one, which had already destroyed. 
Mirza Adigozal bey wrote his poem “Garabaghname” in advanced ages (about 65 years old).

Mirza Adigozal bey died on September 9, 1848, and was buried in a cemetery of Rahimli village, which was located not far from Goranboy.  A mausoleum was erected on his grave. The date of death is taken from his gravestone.

References

1848 deaths
19th-century Azerbaijani historians
Azerbaijani nobility
1780s births
Year of birth unknown
Place of birth missing
People of the Russo-Persian Wars